The Mayor of Waikato officiates over the Waikato District of New Zealand's North Island.

Jacqui Church is the current mayor. The previous mayor was Allan Sanson, a third generation farmer who had served on the council since 2001 and had been mayor since 2010. His predecessor was another conservative farmer, Peter Harris, who took over the job when the first mayor, another farmer, Angus Macdonald, stood down in 2001. Angus Macdonald died in 2010. The 2021 salary of the mayor was $148,500.

List of mayors
There have been 4 mayors of Waikato.

List of deputy mayors

References

Waikato
Waikato
Waikato District
Waikato